Ncojane or Nojane is a town in the Kalahari desert of Ghanzi District, western Botswana. It is located 20 kilometres from the border with Namibia, and it has a primary School called Ncojane Primary School and secondary school called Marakanelo Community Junior Secondary School and a clinic. The population was 1,439 in 2001 census.

References

Populated places in Botswana
Ghanzi District